Simón Bolívar (1783–1830)  was a Venezuelan military and political leader.

Simón Bolívar or Simon Bolivar may also refer to:

Arts and entertainment
Simón Bolívar (1942 film), a Mexican film
Simón Bolívar (1969 film), a Spanish film
Simón Bolívar (opera), by Thea Musgrave
Simón Bolívar (Tadolini), three bronze statues in various locations
Statue of Simón Bolívar (Houston), U.S.
Statue of Simón Bolívar, London, England
Equestrian statue of Simón Bolívar (Central Park), New York, U.S.
Equestrian statue of Simón Bolívar (Washington, D.C.), U.S.
Cantata infantil Simón Bolívar, a work by Rubén Cedeño
Orquesta Sinfónica Simón Bolívar, a Venezuelan orchestra

Education
Simón Bolívar University (Colombia)
Simón Bolívar University (Mexico)
Simón Bolívar University (Venezuela)
Simón Bolívar United World College of Agriculture, in Venezuela
Instituto Simón Bolívar, a school in Mexico City
Colegio Simón Bolívar (Simon Bolivar University), a school in Mexico City

Places
Villa Simón Bolívar, Santa Cruz, Bolivia
Ensanche Simón Bolívar, a sector in Santo Domingo, Dominican Republic
Simón Bolívar Canton, Ecuador
Simón Bolívar, Ecuador, a town
General Simón Bolívar Municipality, Durango, Mexico
General Simón Bolívar, a city
Simón Bolívar District, Paraguay
Simón Bolívar District, Peru
Simón Bolívar Municipality, Anzoátegui, Venezuela
Simón Bolívar Municipality, Miranda, Venezuela
Simón Bolívar Municipality, Zulia, Zulia, Venezuela
Simon Bolivar, Tehran, Iran

Sport
Copa Simón Bolívar, a football league in Bolivia
Copa Simón Bolívar (Venezuela), a football league

Transport

Simón Bolívar (barque), a training vessel for the Venezuelan Navy
Simón Bolívar (TransMilenio), a bus station in Bogotá, Colombia
Simón Bolívar metro station (Monterrey), Mexico
Simón Bolívar metro station (Santiago), Chile
Libertador Simón Bolívar Terminal, a railway station in Caracas, Venezuela
USS Simon Bolivar (SSBN-641), an American submarine

Other uses
International Simón Bolívar Prize, a UNESCO award
Venesat-1 "Simón Bolívar", a Venezuelan satellite

See also

List of places and things named after Simón Bolivar
Bolívar (disambiguation)
Orindatus Simon Bolivar Wall (1825–1891), the first black man to be commissioned as captain in the Regular U.S. Army
Simon Bolivar Buckner (1823–1914), American soldier and politician
Simon Bolivar Buckner Jr. (1886–1945), American lieutenant general during World War II